John Marinov is an Australian former professional tennis player.

Marinov, who had been a highly ranked junior, started on the professional tour in the late 1980s. Featuring mostly in satellite and Challenger tournaments, he reached a best singles ranking of 411 in the world. In 1989 he made a main draw appearance at the Australian Open, where he lost in the first round to Danie Visser.

References

External links
 
 

Year of birth missing (living people)
Living people
Australian male tennis players